Postřekov is a municipality and village in the Domažlice District in the Plzeň Region of the Czech Republic. It has about 1,100 inhabitants.

Administrative parts
Village of Mlýnec is an administrative part of Postřekov.

Twin towns – sister cities

Postřekov is twinned with:
 Ascha, Germany
 Pakrac, Croatia

References

Villages in Domažlice District
Chodové